Two human polls made up the 2009–10 NCAA Division I men's ice hockey rankings, the USCHO.com/CBS College Sports poll and the USA Today/USA Hockey Magazine poll. As the 2009–10 season progressed, rankings were updated weekly.

Legend

USA Today/USA Hockey Magazine

USCHO

See also
2009–10 NCAA Division I men's ice hockey season

References

College men's ice hockey rankings in the United States